This is a sortable table of notable people known for their accomplishments outside of long-distance running who have completed an organized marathon. For elite athletes and others known primarily for running marathons, see List of marathoners or :Category:Long-distance runners. Some of these people have competed in more than one marathon or other running events. This article lists the time and location of each person's fastest time in the marathon.

Table
In the table below, the penultimate column, "Link to Race Results," includes links to databases of race results; this is the reference for verifiability and accuracy of the entry. The last column provides references to the marathoner in the context of celebrity and notability.

Notes
Eddie Izzard ran the equivalent of 43 marathons in 51 days in 2009, though none of these was an organized marathon.

In 2007, Hamish Blake reportedly ran the length of a marathon around a track in Melbourne, "in an attempt to beat Katie Holmes's marathon time. He succeeded, in a time of 5:25:00."

Joe Strummer guitarist and lead vocalist for punk band the Clash, claimed to have run the Paris Marathon in 1982; no records exist of his attempt or finish.

References

External links
Athlinks provides a search tool for marathons in their database
MarathonGuide provides a search tool for marathons in their database (2000 to present)
Marine Corps Marathon information on "famous finishers"
NYRR — New York City Marathon Results, 1970–2014 (searchable)